Tingting is a feminine name of Chinese origin that may refer to:

Jiang Tingting (born 1986), Chinese synchronised swimmer
Liu Tingting (gymnast) (born 2000), Chinese gymnast
Liu Tingting (hammer thrower) (born 1990), Chinese hammer thrower
Liu Tingting (rower) (born 1990), Chinese rower
Shao Tingting (born 1985), Chinese basketball player
Huang Tingting (born 1992), Chinese idol singer
Zhao Tingting (born 1982), Chinese badminton player
Tingting Cojuangco (born 1944), Filipino politician
TingTing Han (born 1979), Chinese oilpainter also known as Han JinYu
Ting-Ting Hu  (born 1979), English-born Taiwanese actress

See also

Ting Ting Cactus Cactus, Chinese syndicate, PLA
Typhoon Tingting, storm around Guam in 2004
The Ting Tings, English indie rock band
Ting Ting, 2010 single by Alexandra Stan from Saxobeats

Chinese feminine given names